The Democratic Party (DP) was a liberal political party in South Korea. Formerly named United Democratic Party (UDP), it was the main opposition party in the 18th Assembly. In late 2011, it merged into the Democratic United Party.

History

The party was originally formed as the Uri Party (Yeollin Uri-dang) when loyalists to president Roh Moo-hyun in the Millennium Democratic Party chose to break ranks from other party members who showed lukewarm support for the administration. Some 42 out of 103 lawmakers of the Millennium Democratic Party joined the new party, and 5 lawmakers from the Grand National Party also joined, seeking to complete political reforms. As a result of the 2004 Parliamentary election, the party won an outright majority in the National Assembly by winning 152 of 299 seats. It was the first time in over 40 years that a centre-left party had won a majority in the legislature.

On 18 August 2007, the delegates of the Uri Party decided to disband the party and merge with the newly-created liberal party Grand Unified Democratic New Party. After a year, the Grand Unified Democratic New Party merged with the Democratic Party on 17 February 2008, to form the United Democratic Party (Tonghapminjudang). In July 2008, the party changed its name to the Democratic Party.

In local elections 2010, the Democratic Party scored a victory in eight mayoral and gubernatorial posts, including the Inchon mayorship.

On 16 December 2011, the DP merged with the minor Citizens Unity Party to form the Democratic United Party. The Korean Confederation of Trade Unions also participated in the forming.

Presidents of DP
Preceding party: United New Democratic Party & Democratic Party (2007)
 Son Hak-Gyu & Park Sang-Chun (17 February 2008 – 29 May 2008)
 Chung Se-kyun (30 May 2008 – 3 October 2010)
 Son Hak-gyu (3 October 2010 - Incumbent)
Succeeding party: Democratic United Party

Election results

Notes

References

External links
Video on South Korea-US Relations from the Dean Peter Krogh Foreign Affairs Digital Archives
Official site 

Defunct political parties in South Korea
Defunct liberal political parties
Democratic parties in South Korea
Korean nationalist parties